Yo Te Necesito (English: I Need You) is the seventh studio album recorded by Mexican band Los Bukis. It was released by Melody in 1982 (see 1982 in music). Las Musiqueras was also the name of the movie starring Los Bukis. The album was nominated for a Grammy Award for Best Mexican-American Performance.

Track listing
All songs written and composed by Marco Antonio Solís, except where otherwise noted.

References

External links
 Yo Te Necesito on amazon.com
[] Yo Te Necesito on allmusic.com

1982 albums
Los Bukis albums
Fonovisa Records albums